Thunder Island is the second studio album by American musician Jay Ferguson. The title track became a top ten hit on the Billboard Hot 100 chart.

The album was first issued on compact disc by the Collector's Choice label. The album was reissued as part of a two disc set including Ferguson's first and third solo albums by Edsel. The booklet included a new interview with Ferguson discussing the making of his first three albums.

Producer Bill Szymczyk recruited much of the same personnel as Ferguson's first solo album including Joe Walsh to play on the album which was recorded in the same Miami studio as the Eagles' Hotel California and other big albums of the era.

Track listing

Musicians
 Jay Ferguson - vocals, keyboards
 Stan Kipper - drums
 Joey Murcia - guitar
 Tony Battaglia - guitar
 Harold Cowart - bass guitar

Guest musicians
 Joe Walsh - guitar
 Bob Webb - guitar
 Ed Brown - bass guitar
 Bill Szymczyk - percussion

Production
 Bill Szymczyk - producer, engineer
 Ed Mashal - assistant producer, engineer
 Lee Hulko - mastering

References

1977 albums
Jay Ferguson (American musician) albums
Albums produced by Bill Szymczyk
Asylum Records albums